Vershini was a wife of Romapada, the king of Anga, and an elder sister of Kausalya.

Story
Vershini and Kausalya were daughters of Kaushala king Sukaushala and queen Amritaprabha. Vershini was married to Romapada, the king of Anga, and Kausalya to Dasharatha, the king of Ayodhya. Romapada was a good friend of Dasharatha as both of them were educated at the ashram of the sage Vasistha. Shanta was born to Dashratha and Kausalya. Shanta was later given to Romapada as his foster child by Dashratha. Later, Shanta was wedded to sage Rishyasringa. Hence, she was married to him, and the sage was given position of a prince in the Anga Kingdom.

References

Characters in the Ramayana